The Rosario derby ("Clásico Rosarino") is one of the most fiercely contested football rivalries in Argentine football.

It is played between the two main teams from Rosario, Newell's Old Boys and Rosario Central. It is widely regarded as the most important Argentine derby outside of Buenos Aires and the Buenos Aires Province.

History
The first Rosario derby was played on June 18, 1905; it resulted in a 1–0 win for Newell's Old Boys with a goal from Faustino González.

The clubs continued to play each other in the "Liga Rosarina de Fútbol" for many years. In 1939 the two clubs were admitted to the Argentine Primera, and the first game at this level resulted in a 1–1 draw on June 18, 1939.

Experts claim that the Mexican Monterrey derby holds similarities with the Rosario derby. The teams are crosstown rivals from cities away from the capital and have very passionate fans.

Rosario Central has the edge over Newell's, with 91 wins compared to 76 counting every encounter. Rosario also has more trophies, with 30 against 24, although Newell's has won the league title six times, twice more than Rosario Central.

Nicknames
The teams' nicknames relate from the incident where Rosario Central refused to play a charity game for a leprosy charity, hence their nickname "Canallas' (Scoundrels). Newell's Old Boys stepped in to play the game and earned the nickname "Los Leprosos" (The Lepers).

List of matches

Primera División 

Notes

National cups

Statistics

Matches by association

Total numbers 

Notes

Top scorers

Since the clubs joined the AFA league system in 1939 the top scorers are Edgardo Bauza (Central) and Santiago Santamaría (Newell's), with 9 each.

Most appearances

Biggest wins

Most consecutive wins

Unbeaten runs

Titles  

Notes

Newell's Old Boys highlights
June 18, 1905: Won 1–0 in the first Rosario derby of all history.
August 8, 1909: Won 3–2 to record their 10th straight win over Rosario Central.
July 28, 1912: Won 0–7 to record the biggest ever away win in the Rosario derby.  
October 20, 1912: Manuel Lito González scored all 5 goals in a 5–3 win.
October 12, 1941: Won 5–0 to record the biggest win in the Rosario derby since the start of the professional era of Argentine football.
June 2, 1974: Newell's won their first ever title by coming from 2-0 down at half time to record the draw they needed to win the Metropolitano 1974.

Rosario Central highlights
August 2, 1908: Won 9–3 in the highest scoring derby, with 5 goals from Corti.
May 25, 1914: Harry Hayes scored a hat-trick to help Rosario Central win 6–2, starting a run of 11 consecutive wins.
October 17, 1915: Won 0–6 to record their best ever away win in the fixture.
June 29, 1916: Won 8–0 in a qualifier for the Copa de Honor.
1917: Won 9–0 to record the biggest ever win in the official's derby fixture.
December 19, 1971: Won 1–0 in the semi-final of the Nacional championship. Then, finally Central was the Argentine Champion.
April 11, 1975: Won 1–0 in a Copa Libertadores playoff to eliminate Newell's and progress to the 2nd round.
1980: Won 3:1 in the aggregate in the semi-final of the National Championship. It was 3:0 at home and 0:1 at Newell's stadium. Then, as in 1971, Rosario Central won the final, and was the Argentina's champion again.
August 29, 2005: Won 1–0 in the second leg of a Copa Sudamericana preliminary round, to progress 1–0 on aggregate.
 November 1, 2018: Won 1–2 in the 2017–18 Copa Argentina in quarter finals. Then, Rosario Central won the final, and was the champion of the tournament.

References

External links
 
Futbol de Rosario statistics 1905-present 
Universo futbol statistics 1939-present

Argentine football rivalries
Newell's Old Boys
Rosario Central